Oyuunbatyn Bayarjargal (born 16 August 1989) is a Mongolian international footballer. He made his first appearance for the Mongolia national football team in 2013, when he made a substitute appearance in the first match of 2014 AFC Challenge Cup qualification process.

He was named the Mongolia's Player of the Year in 2015.

International goals
Scores and results list Mongolia's goal tally first.

References

1989 births
Living people
Mongolian footballers
Mongolia international footballers
Association football midfielders
Mongolian National Premier League players